Carol Bentley Ellis (February 26, 1945 – December 13, 2021) was a state legislator in California.

Early life and education 
She was born Carol Curtis in Riverside, California, the daughter of Francis Curtis and Irene Ingberg Curtis. She had a twin sister, Joy. She studied marketing at San Diego State University, and graduated from SDSU in 1968.

Career 
A Republican, Bentley was a legislative aide before she served three terms in the California State Assembly, from 1989 to 1993 In 1989, she ran in a special election for a state senate seat; her opponent Lucy Killea was denied communion by the Roman Catholic bishop of San Diego, for her pro-choice position on abortion; the story drew national attention, and increased donations for Killea's winning campaign.  In 1991, she ran for a state senate seat again. Also in 1991, she proposed a bill that would directly benefit one of her contributors, Coleman College, by exempting them from state financial oversight. In 1992, her opponent David G. Kelley accused her of taking inappropriate expense reimbursements from the state. She advocated for crime victims, and was a member of the California Board of Prison Terms from 1993 to 2005. After her career in politics ended, she sold real estate in Mission Beach.

Personal life 
Curtis married David Bentley in 1967; they divorced in 1990. She remarried in 1997, to politician Jim Ellis, who died in 2017. She died in 2021, at the age of 76.

References

1945 births
2021 deaths
Republican Party members of the California State Assembly
People from Riverside, California
San Diego State University alumni